College Park station is a limited-service, weekday-only Caltrain station serving the College Park neighborhood and the Bellarmine College Preparatory school in San Jose, California.

Service 
The station is served by four trains per weekday. In the morning, one northbound train from Gilroy and one local service southbound train from San Francisco serve the station. In the afternoon, one southbound train to Gilroy and one limited-stop northbound train to San Francisco stop at College Park. There is no weekend service.

Due to the small size of the station platforms, only the three northern-most cars of each train open their doors to allow passengers to board and alight. The two southern cars (next to locomotive) do not open.

History 
Before Caltrain, College Park was a station on Southern Pacific's Peninsula Commute line, in fare zone 6 (brown). It is mentioned in Jack London's 1903 novel The Call of the Wild as the location at which the stolen canine protagonist is fenced, beginning his journey away from civilization.

In August 2005, service was reduced from 12 daily trains to four. The nearby students at Bellarmine College Preparatory who use the station have a history of protesting to protect it from removal.

The platform is planned to be rebuilt to accommodate through-running California High-Speed Rail service.

References

External links 

College Park station information – Caltrain

Caltrain stations in Santa Clara County, California
Railway stations in San Jose, California
Railway stations in California at university and college campuses
Former Southern Pacific Railroad stations in California